Loose Talk Costs Lives are a London, UK based band who present a diverse form of popular music, taking influence from artists such as XTC, Four Brothers, Talking Heads, Owls and Steve Reich.

James Rapson (guitars and vocals), Oliver Route (guitars), Tim Clay (guitars, keyboards) Liam Klimek (bass) and Greg Round (drums) all met whilst studying at University in Leeds before forming at the start of 2010. The band have since supported the likes of Wild Beasts, Two Door Cinema Club, Maps and Atlases and Good Shoes around the UK.

In December 2010 they released their first double A-side single “Some Nice Flowers / Wreck Ashore” and in Spring/Summer 2011 they are due to release their debut EP “Wax and Gold” - recorded and produced by James Kenosha (Grammatics, Chapel Club, Dinosaur Pile-Up and Pulled Apart By Horses).

History 

Loose Talk Costs Lives were originally a continuation of a band Greg and James had started before meeting Liam at University in Leeds. The band's first gig was in Leeds' Royal Park Cellars in 2009 where they supported one of Oliver Route's earlier bands. Over the rest of 2009 the band supported various acts including Two Door Cinema Club, Chew Lips, Underground Heroes and Video Nasties. In November 2009 Oliver joined the line up as second guitarist. The band ended the year by playing a sold out Leeds club night Silver Hips (co-owned by Liam) at Hi-Fi.

In 2010 saw the band gained a slot on the Main Stage at Live At Leeds Festival on the Leeds Metropolitan University stage alongside Wild Beasts and The Invisible. The band also played with bands such as Hot Club De Paris Japandroids and Good Shoes.

In April they travelled down to Eastbourne to record their first single ('"Some Nice Flowers / Wreck Ashore'"). After putting a rough mix of one of their new recordings (Wreck Ashore) on NME Breakthrough, they were entered into the final of a competition to play at Lovebox festival, which was whittled down from hundreds of bands to just 5 by a panel of judges consisting of NME editor Krissi Murison, Groove Armada's Tom Findlay, NME New Music Editor Jaimie Hodgson, Peter Elliot from Primary Talent International and Rob Silver from Lovebox. The singles were eventually mixed by James Kenosha (Grammatics, Chapel Club and Pulled Apart By Horses) and self-released on 6 December 2010. 
 
The band were also featured in the NME Breakthrough compilation, NME magazine as Breakthrough Artist of the week, Gill Mills Best of Myspace Podcast 98, which was featured on the main page of Myspace as well as their demo of Gold being named as one of the 5 NME breakthrough tracks you have to hear. They also recorded a live session for BBC Leeds West Yorkshire Raw Talent Radio show where James, Ollie and Liam performed stripped down version of 3 songs. Over the rest of 2010 the band supported bands such as Fool's Gold and Maps & Atlases.

2011 to 2012

2011 saw the band play another sold-out show at the Silver Hips club on the night before heading into the studio with James Kenosha (Pulled Apart By Horses, Grammatics) to record their debut EP Wax & Gold. The EP dropped on 8 August 2011. In support of its release, the band took to the stage at various festivals over the summer including Live at Leeds, Newcastle's Evolution and Sheffield's Tramlines along with confirmed performances at both Yorkshire's Beacons and London's Leefest.

Nearly a year after Wax & Gold was released, the band announced its break-up. On 29 July 2012 the band posted on Facebook, saying:

"...it is with heavy hearts that we bring you the news that Loose Talk Costs Lives has unfortunately come to an end. We are extremely grateful to everyone that has ever helped us out, put us on, come to a show, listened to or bought any of our music or merch. We have had some of the best times in this band over the past 3 years, we have been to a lot of amazing places and met a lot of amazing people along the way, which we will never forget. However we feel that at this moment we have gone as far as we can with the band. This being said, we are all still great friends and will continue to make and release music in the future."

The band then released a free album of "old unreleased demo's and live acoustic & stripped down versions of some songs" on their Bandcamp.com page shortly after their break-up.

Releases 

 Some Nice Flowers/Wreck Ashore  - Release Date: 6 December 2010
 Wax & Gold - Release Date: 8 August 2011
 . - Release Date: 15 August 2012

Members 

 James Rapson - Vocals/Guitar
 Oliver Route - Guitar
Tim Clay - Guitar, Keys
 Liam Klimek - Bass
 Greg Round - Drums and Percussion

References 

English pop music groups
Musical groups established in 2008